Calcagninus is a genus of cicadas in the family Cicadidae. There are at least three described species in Calcagninus.

Species
These three species belong to the genus Calcagninus:
 Calcagninus divaricatus Bliven, 1964 c g
 Calcagninus nilgirensis (Distant, 1887) c g
 Calcagninus picturatus (Distant, 1888) c g
Data sources: i = ITIS, c = Catalogue of Life, g = GBIF, b = Bugguide.net

References

Further reading

 
 
 
 

Leptopsaltriini
Cicadidae genera